Claude Perron (born 23 January 1966) is a French actress.

Career
Perron appeared in the role of Eva (Nino's colleague) in the 2001 film Amélie, and Marion in the 1996 film Bernie. She also plays in the French TV series WorkinGirls.

Filmography

References

External links

1966 births
Living people
Actors from Nantes
20th-century French actresses
21st-century French actresses
French film actresses
French television actresses
French stage actresses